Acrolophus cockerelli is a moth of the family Acrolophidae. It is found in North America, including Arizona, Nevada, New Mexico, Oklahoma, Oregon and Texas.

The wingspan is about 17 mm.

References

cockerelli
Moths described in 1900